Razors on Backstreet (stylized as RAZORS ON BACKSTREET) is the third studio album by Japanese Darkwave band, Aural Vampire. The album was released December 7, 2013 in Japan and internationally on March 7, 2014.

Overview

Release

Musical style
The album features a much heavier, rock-influenced style of music. The album is the first to feature new band members; Wu-Chy on bass, Higuchuuhei on guitar, Zen on keyboard, and Izu on drums. Previous releases (with the exception of "Soloween") featured only lead-vocalist Exo-Chika and producer Raveman.

Artwork and theme
The album has an 1980s horror theme. Both the cover and title of the album are an allusion to the 1984 American horror slasher film, A Nightmare on Elm Street. This is the band's first album cover to not feature lead-singer Exo-Chika, instead it features only their producer, Raveman.

Track listing

Personnel 
Exo-Chika – vocals
Raveman – production, lyrics
Wu-Chy – bass 
Higuchuuhei – guitar 
Zen – keyboard
Izu – drums

External links
Official Website

References

2014 albums
Japanese-language albums